CIPO may refer to:

 Canadian Intellectual Property Office
 Capital Improvement Program Office ("CIPO"), construction management software
 Chief Innovation and Product Officer
 Chronic intestinal pseudo-obstruction
 Mario Cipollini ("Cipo"), Italian retired professional cyclist
 Popular Indigenous Council of Oaxaca "Ricardo Flores Magon", or CIPO-RFM, an organization of indigenous communities in Oaxaca state, Mexico

See also
 Cipó, a municipality in Brazil